Aleksei Barkalov (18 February 1946 – 9 September 2004) was a Ukrainian water polo player who competed in the 1968, 1972, 1976 and 1980 Summer Olympics and won two gold and one silver medals for the Soviet Union team. During his career, he played 412 games for the national team, more than any other athlete in the water polo history. In 1993, he was inducted to the International Swimming Hall of Fame.

Biography
Barkalov was born in the village of Vvedenka near Kharkiv and graduated from the Kharkiv Polytechnic Institute. Before choosing water polo, he played basketball for the Kharkiv city team, as well as football. Since 1957 he competed in water polo for Dynamo Kharkiv and in 1971 changed to Dynamo Kyiv. Since 1976 he acted both as a player and a coach for Dynamo Kyiv. After retirement in 1980 he became the head coach of the Junior Water Polo Team of Ukraine. Between 1990 and 1994 he worked in Yugoslavia, coaching the water polo club of Novi Sad. He then returned to Ukraine and from 1997 to 1999 acted as President of the Water Polo Federation of Ukraine. He received the following awards: Order of Friendship, Order For Merit to the Fatherland (3rd class) and Order of Merit (Ukraine).

Barkalov married Lyudmila Khazieva, a competitive swimmer who won a European bronze medal in 1966. Their only son, Dmitri, also played competitive water polo, but then became a businessman and was killed in 2001 at the age 32. This tragedy shattered the health of Barkalov, who died of a heart attack three years later.

See also
 Soviet Union men's Olympic water polo team records and statistics
 List of Olympic champions in men's water polo
 List of Olympic medalists in water polo (men)
 List of players who have appeared in multiple men's Olympic water polo tournaments
 List of men's Olympic water polo tournament top goalscorers
 List of world champions in men's water polo
 List of World Aquatics Championships medalists in water polo
 List of members of the International Swimming Hall of Fame

References

External links
 

1946 births
2004 deaths
Ukrainian male water polo players
Soviet male water polo players
Olympic water polo players of the Soviet Union
Water polo players at the 1968 Summer Olympics
Water polo players at the 1972 Summer Olympics
Water polo players at the 1976 Summer Olympics
Water polo players at the 1980 Summer Olympics
Olympic gold medalists for the Soviet Union
Olympic silver medalists for the Soviet Union
Olympic medalists in water polo
Dynamo sports society athletes
Kharkiv Polytechnic Institute alumni
Medalists at the 1980 Summer Olympics
Medalists at the 1972 Summer Olympics
Medalists at the 1968 Summer Olympics
World Aquatics Championships medalists in water polo
Sportspeople from Kharkiv Oblast